Serhiy Syzykhin (born 2 March 1980, Zhdanov, Ukrainian SSR) is a former Ukrainian footballer and football coach.

External links
 
 

1980 births
Living people
Sportspeople from Mariupol
Ukrainian footballers
Ukrainian expatriate footballers
Expatriate footballers in Armenia
FC Mashynobudivnyk Druzhkivka players
FC Metalurh-2 Donetsk players
FC Spartak Sumy players
FC Hoverla Uzhhorod players
FC Stal Kamianske players
FC Urartu players
FC Helios Kharkiv players
FC Dnipro Cherkasy players
Ukrainian football managers
FC Helios Kharkiv managers
Association football midfielders